The Boulet Brothers are drag artists, television personalities, writers, producers and modern day horror hosts. They were featured on the cover of Fangoria as "Horror's New Icons" in 2022. Their projects have included horror themed television shows, live nightlife productions, books, movies, and comic books. Since 2016 the Boulet Brothers have produced and starred in the reality competition series The Boulet Brothers' Dragula, which features contestants showcasing dark, horror-themed drag looks. 

Outside of their television projects, the Boulet Brothers (Dracmorda and Swanthula) appear regularly as featured guests, performers and emcees at horror conventions, nightclubs and live events. The Boulets are considered prolific nightclub producers with a career creating legendary nightlife events. The Boulet Brothers are also widely celebrated in the LGBTQ+ community due to the inclusive nature of their creative endeavors.

Television career

The Boulet Brothers’ Dragula 

The Boulet Brothers are most known for their reality TV competition series The Boulet Brothers' Dragula. The show is loosely based on a nightlife event of the same name created by the Boulet Brothers and is currently in its fourth season streaming on Shudder. Many of the challenges and themes of the show were inspired by nightlife events hosted by the Boulet Brothers. The show has received international praise for its creativity, talent and diversity. The Boulet Brothers serve as the showrunners, executive producers and hosts of the show.

The Boulet Brothers wrote, produced and co-directed a spin-off film titled Boulet Brothers' Dragula: Resurrection, which Digital Spy described as "part-horror movie, part-documentary and part-reality competition." The film was released as an original film on AMC Networks' Shudder streaming service on October 20, 2020.

Other television appearances 
Dracmorda and Swanthula Boulet were guests on Behind the Monsters, a docuseries on the history of horror icons such as Chucky, Michael Myers, and Pinhead. They were also guests on "Heartbreak Trailer Park", a special episode of the series The Last Drive-in with Joe Bob Briggs. In the episode they discussed topics such as love and the horror genre with Joe Bob Briggs.

Podcasts

Creatures of the Night Podcast 

The Boulet Brothers are the executive producers and hosts of Dread Central's (previously Fangoria’s) The Boulet Brothers’ Creatures of the Night Podcast. The show is co-hosted by Ian Devoglaer, the supervising producer of The Boulet Brothers' Dragula. The podcast is a horror variety show styled after a 1940s style radio program. Each episode offers an introductory dialogue, a newscast and discussion of entertainment news, a horror movie review, and listener questions. The show's "Haunting of History" segment revisits famous historical hauntings. Other segments of the podcast include celebrity interviews and literary discussions called "Swanthula's Book Nook". Guests include Rose McGowan, Poppy, Dita Von Teese, Rachel True, Darren Stein, Yvie Oddly, Katya Zamolodchikova, and Lin Shaye. Books discussed include Stephen King's "Children of the Corn", Clive Barker's The Hellbound Heart, and Brian Lumley's Necroscope.

Dragula Live Tour 
The Boulet Brothers present the "Dragula Live Tour", a series of live performances featuring contestants from the Dragula series. The Boulet Brothers described the show as "a little bit of filth, and a lot of glamour and a little bit of shock. And maybe get covered in blood a little bit. It’s gonna be a little messy." The United Kingdom leg of the Dragula Season 4 World tour began at Clapham Grand in London in March, and performed in cities such as Glasgow, Manchester, Brighton, Leeds, Nottingham and Birmingham. The United States leg of the Dragula tour began on April 27, 2022, and ended on June 2, 2022.

The Season 4 World tour sold out, and received positive reviews from critics. Chris Selman of Gay Times praised the show, writing that "four diverse and engaging performers, a pair of enigmatic hosts, a rock band routine and an audience challenge to throw in some variety, and impressive production values." He concluded that "this twisted troupe present quite the macabre drag variety show." Alex Warren of Horror Press had similar praise for the tour, writing that it had "otherworldly performances" and "sleek and sexy production values."

Comic books and print publication 
The Boulet Brothers got their start in the comic book industry, and they write and produce comic book content. They hosted a special "Halloween Takeover" issue of Heavy Metal (Issue #311) in 2021. Longtime fans of Heavy Metal, they described hosting the issue as a "full circle moment" that tied together their love of comic books, horror and drag. The issue, which was co-edited by Morgan Rosenblum and Steve Orlando, features subversive horror stories written by Orlando, Axelle Carolyn, and Alaska Thunderfuck 5000, among others. "The Vault of Saumagotha – Part Two", one of the stories included in the issue, was co-written by and about the Boulet Brothers. The Boulet Brothers had first announced their intention to work on a comic book with Orlando on the Creatures of the Night podcast in 2020.

The issue was well received for its writing, themes and art. Jeff Robertson of Screen Rant said that the book "unleash[es] their unique blend of seductive and irreverent terror on the unsuspecting public."

Public image 
The Boulet Brothers are noted figures in the queer and horror communities. They were featured on the cover of horror magazine Fangoria Vol. 2, Issue #13. Their distinctive style often incorporates colored contact lenses and matching outfits. Many of their looks are inspired by classic horror films, femme fatales, punk fashion, and villains from film, comic books and television series. Rue Morgue's Carly Maga described them as "the unofficial lords of the underworld of drag performance, instantly recognizable by their matching gothic, otherworldly looks; the high-glam drag lovechildren of Anna Wintour, a Cenobite, and the Grady twins."

Music 
The Boulet Brothers' released their debut EP titled Time to Die in October 2021. The EP consists of four original songs including "Wicked Love" which was created for The Boulet Brothers' Dragula season 4 Episode 5 challenge. The Boulet Brothers' also released an instrumental Official Boulet Brothers’ Dragula Season 4 Soundtrack in December of 2021. The soundtrack features the floorshow music and main thematic tracks used in the fourth season of the show.

Personal lives 
The couple do not appear out of drag on television or in interviews and lead private personal lives. They have stated in interviews that they are not brothers but romantic partners who have been a couple for over twenty years.

Filmography

Discography

Soundtrack albums

Extended plays

Singles

References

Bibliography 

 Doonan, Simon. 2019. Drag: The Complete Story. Laurence King Publishing.

Further reading 

 Goodman, Elyssa. 2019. Blood, Guts, and Glamour: How Dragula Made Drag Dangerous Again. Them.

 Earp, Catherine. 2018. Dragula's The Boulet Brothers reveal the secrets to staying together for so long. Digital Spy.

 Lecaro, Lina. 2016. The Boulet Brothers Keep L.A.'S Gay Nightlife Weird. LA Weekly.

 Cooper, Michael. 2019. Drag In L.A.: The Boulet Brothers Bring Dark Debauchery to Nightlife - & TV. LA Weekly.

 Jones, Anna. 2019. The Boulet Brothers’ Queer Horror Empire. WUSSY MAG.

 Zee, Adam. 2019. 'Dragula' is the Future of Drag and 'Drag Race' is a Tired Ass Showgirl. Wussy Mag.

External links 

 Official Website

Year of birth missing (living people)
Living people
American drag queens
21st-century LGBT people
American screenwriters
LGBT people from California
Television producers from California
American comics creators
LGBT comics creators